Tari Mahalleh (also Romanized as Tārī Maḩalleh; also known as Ţāherī Maḩalleh) is a village in Karipey Rural District, Lalehabad District, Babol County, Mazandaran Province, Iran. At the 2016 census, its population was 452, in 115 families.

References 

Populated places in Babol County